Chinka is a village in the municipal unit of Molossoi, Ioannina regional unit, Greece. In 2011 its population was 90. It is situated on a hillside above the right bank of the river Tyria. It is 4 km east of Agios Christoforos, 14 km northwest of Dodoni and 20 km west of Ioannina.

Population

See also

List of settlements in the Ioannina regional unit

External links
Chinka at the GTP Travel Pages

References

Populated places in Ioannina (regional unit)